Kani Seyf may refer to:
 Kani Seyf, Alut
 Kani Seyf, Nanur